Kong Ho-won (born 4 September 1997) is a South Korea footballer currently playing as a defender for Hougang United.

Career statistics

Club

Notes

References

Living people
1997 births
South Korean footballers
Association football midfielders
Singapore Premier League players
Hougang United FC players
Place of birth missing (living people)
People from Paju
Sportspeople from Gyeonggi Province